Mike Stankovic (born November 11, 1956) is a retired Serbian-American soccer defender who played professionally in the North American Soccer League, Major Indoor Soccer League and National Professional Soccer League.

Biography
In 1980, he moved to the United States where he signed with the Memphis Rogues of the North American Soccer League., where he was voted Most Valuable Player but missed their run at the 1979–80 NASL Indoor season finals through suspension after receiving a red card in the Division Finals against the Minnesota Kicks. 

He moved to the Dallas Tornado in the fall of 1980 and played for the Tornado during the 1980-1981 NASL indoor season.  He played the 1981 outdoor season with the Tornado, then moved indoors permanently when he signed with the Baltimore Blast of the Major Indoor Soccer League.  In August 1987, he signed as a free agent with the Wichita Wings.  During his six seasons with the Blast, Stankovic was a five time All Star.  On January 20, 1989, the Wings traded Stankovic and Peter Ward to the Blast in exchange for Keder and David Byrne.

After retiring from pro soccer he founded the "Mike Stankovic Pro Soccer Academy".  In 2010, Stankovic served as an assistant to  Milovan Rajevac on the Ghana national football team at the 2010 FIFA World Cup.  After the cup, Rajevac and Stankovic moved to manage the Qatar national football team.

In March 2013, Stankovic was one of six men named to the 2013 class of the Indoor Soccer Hall of Fame. The other inductees are Gordon Jago, Preki, Kai Haaskivi, Zoltán Tóth, and Brian Quinn.

In 2023, the Baltimore Blast retired jersey #5 to honor Stankovic and Denison Cabral.

Awards and honors
MISL All-Star Team: 1985
MISL 10th Year Anniversary All Decade Team
Voted Memphis Rogues Most Valuable Player: 1980
1983–84 Major Indoor Soccer League Champion

References

External links
NASL/MISL stats

1956 births
Living people
Baltimore Blast (1980–1992) players
Baltimore Spirit players
Dallas Tornado players
Major Indoor Soccer League (1978–1992) coaches
Major Indoor Soccer League (1978–1992) players
Memphis Rogues players
North American Soccer League (1968–1984) indoor players
National Professional Soccer League (1984–2001) coaches
National Professional Soccer League (1984–2001) players
North American Soccer League (1968–1984) players
Yugoslav footballers
Yugoslav expatriate footballers
Wichita Wings (MISL) players
Expatriate soccer players in the United States
Yugoslav expatriates in the United States
Association football defenders